= Nunavut Kamatsiaqtut Help Line =

Canadian telephone counseling service

The Nunavut Kamatsiaqtut Help Line is a telephone counseling and contact service for people in northern Canada who are in crisis. The name Kamatsiaqtut is the Inuktitut language name used by Inuit; it means “thoughtful people who care."

Since becoming operational on January 15, 1990, the Help Line has operated 365 days a year. In 1994, it expanded its services to include the Nunavut AIDS Information Line. The calling area also includes northern Quebec and other remote areas of Canada.

In 1994 and 2003, Kamatsiaqtut hosted the Canadian Association for Suicide Prevention annual conference in Iqaluit, Nunavut's capital.
